The Center for Women In Technology (CWIT) was established at the University of Maryland, Baltimore County in July 1998. The center's original name was the "Center for Women and Information Technology", and it was founded to encourage women as both developers of information technology and to women's experiences as users of IT. The original CWIT site included a large number of resources and links and served as a clearinghouse about women and information technology. This work included focusing on K-12 education as well as supporting university students, and work force advancement and retention. The center has included engineering majors since 2006, and in 2011 its name was changed to the Center for Women In Technology.

Scholarship programs 

The Center for Women in Technology Scholars Program is a merit scholarship opportunity for talented undergraduates majoring in computer science, computer engineering, information systems or a related program.  It is open to high school seniors planning to major in one of these areas of study. Scholars in the program receive mentoring from university faculty and IT professionals as well as participate in specially designed activities and events.

CWIT and the UMBC Center for Cybersecurity jointly run the UMBC Cyber Scholars Program with the goal of preparing the next generation of cybersecurity professionals.  The program is funded by the Northrop Grumman Foundation.

Programs

High school students and teachers 
CWIT Scholars
Cyber Scholars (also open to transfer students and current UMBC students)
Bits & Bytes
BEST of CWIT

UMBC students 
T-SITE Scholars
CWIT Affiliates
Cyber Affiliates
CWIT Peer Mentoring
CWIT Living Learning Community
Parents for Women in Technology (PWIT)

Industry professionals 
Industry Mentor Program

Past programs 
SITE Scholars Program

References

External links 
Center for Women In Technology
CWIT Scholars Program

University of Maryland, Baltimore County
Women in Maryland
Women in computing
Information technology organizations based in North America
Organizations for women in science and technology
Science and technology in Maryland
University subdivisions in Maryland